Virtual Control is the third solo album by video game music composer Frank Klepacki, released in 2005 and featuring ten songs.


Track listing
 He Lives
 Gar
 Vegas In Crowd
 Cigar Bar
 Smack Dat
 Frank K is Back
 Virtual Control
 Retrophonic
 Dominate
 Vengeance Beast

All tracks were written and performed by Frank Klepacki.

Personnel
Frank Klepacki - All instruments and programming

External links
Frank Klepacki's website, featuring information on the band
The Connextion
X-Rated Superstar music video

2005 albums
Frank Klepacki albums